Polystachya subdiphylla is a species of orchid native to Tanzania, in the Nguru Mountains and Uluguru Mountains.

subdiphylla
Orchids of Tanzania
Endemic flora of Tanzania